The Rutherglen Bridge or the Shawfield Bridge is a bridge which was built 1893–96, which crosses the River Clyde, in Scotland.

Bridgeton is in fact named after the first bridge at the site that was constructed in 1776 and designed by James Watt, which stood until 1890.

The road is part of the Glasgow East End Regeneration Route running between the M8 and M74 motorways. The Glasgow side of the bridge is a convenient point for walkers and cyclists to join the Clyde Walkway or National Cycle Route 75 which share a tarmac path along the river at this point.

It should not be confused with the nearby Dalmarnock Bridge which also connects Rutherglen to Dalmarnock, nor with a modern pedestrian 'Smartbridge' between Shawfield and Dalmarnock.

References

External links 
 http://www.glasgow.gov.uk/en/Residents/Parks_Outdoors/Heritage/HeritageTrails/ClydeBridges/rutherglenbridge.htm
 http://www.localnewsglasgow.co.uk/tag/rutherglen-bridge/
 http://www.scottish-places.info/features/featuremap17488.html
 Record and images for Rutherglen Bridge at Canmore
Painting of the Clyde at (old) Rutherglen Bridge, 19th century by N. Dismarr, hosted at Art UK (work itself held at Hamilton Low Parks Museum)
Painting of (old) Rutherglen Bridge, 19th century by Thomas Grant, hosted at Art UK (work itself held at Hamilton Low Parks Museum)

Bridges in Glasgow
Bridges completed in 1896
Bridges across the River Clyde
Buildings and structures in Rutherglen
Bridgeton–Calton–Dalmarnock
1896 establishments in Scotland
Road bridges in Scotland
Transport in South Lanarkshire